Admiral Bayly may refer to:

Lewis Bayly (Royal Navy officer) (1857–1938), British Royal Navy admiral
Patrick Bayly (1914–1998), British Royal Navy vice admiral

See also
Warner B. Bayley (1845–1928), U.S. Navy rear admiral